College of Medicine may refer to:
Medical school
The College of Medicine, a British healthcare lobby group
Baylor College of Medicine, located in the Texas Medical Center in Houston, Texas, US, a health sciences university